San Zeno di Montagna is a comune (municipality) in the Province of Verona in the Italian region Veneto, located about  west of Venice and about  northwest of Verona.

San Zeno di Montagna borders the following municipalities: Brenzone, Caprino Veronese, Costermano, Ferrara di Monte Baldo, and Torri del Benaco.

References

External links
Official website 

Cities and towns in Veneto